Battle of Warsaw 1920 (pol. Bitwa warszawska 1920) is a Polish historical film directed by Jerzy Hoffman depicting the events of the Battle of Warsaw (1920) of the Polish–Soviet War. It was released in September 2011. It was filmed in 3D using the Fusion Camera System and is one of the most expensive movies in the history of cinema in Poland.

Plot 
1920. After regaining independence, Poland is now seeking to stabilize the situation on the border. Marshal Józef Piłsudski (Daniel Olbrychski) wants to create federations of independent states in the east. Polish authorities announce mobilization. Jan Krynicki (Borys Szyc), a young poet with leftist views, returns to the army. On the day of leaving for the war, he marries Ola (Natasza Urbańska), a beautiful actress from the revue theater. Soon Poles manage to conquer Kiev. Shortly thereafter, Jan, stationed in Ukraine, is accused of Bolshevik agitation and sentenced to death. He is unexpectedly saved from shooting by an attack by the Bolsheviks, who take him captive. After conversations with Commissioner Bykowski (Adam Ferency), Jan finally sees the real calculations of the Red Revolution. In Warsaw, meanwhile, Ola is disturbed by Captain Kostrzewa (Jerzy Bończak). She decides to join the army to help defend the capital against the Bolsheviks constantly pushing west.

Cast 

 Daniel Olbrychski as Józef Piłsudski
 Borys Szyc as Jan Krynicki
 Natasza Urbańska as Ola Raniewska
 Marian Dziędziel as general Tadeusz Rozwadowski
 Bogusław Linda as major Bolesław Wieniawa-Długoszowski
 Jerzy Bończak as capitan Kostrzewa
 Ewa Wiśniewska as Ada
 Stanisława Celińska as Zdzisia
 Adam Ferency as Bykowski
 Olga Kabo as Sofia Nikołajewna
 Jacek Poniedziałek as Józef Haller
 Łukasz Garlicki as priest Ignacy Skorupka
 Wojciech Solarz as Samuel
 Piotr Głowacki as Anatol
 Andrzej Strzelecki as Wincenty Witos
 Wiktor Zborowski as Charles de Gaulle
 Wojciech Pszoniak as general Maxime Weygand
 Bartosz Opania as colonel Bolesław Jaźwiński
 Nikołaj Ortynski as a Bolshevik commander
 Aleksandr Domogarov as sotnik Kryshkin
 Dariusz Biskupski as Ratajczak
 Ewa Wencel as Więcławska
 Marek Kossakowski as Jones
 Artur Owczarek as American journalist
 Dariusz Kordek as Władysław Sikorski
 Michał Żebrowski as Władysław Grabski
 Aleksandr Khoshabaev as Mikhail Tukhachevsky
 Grażyna Szapołowska as Korwin-Piotrowska
 Igor Guzun as Joseph Stalin
 Wiktor Bałabanow as Vladimir Lenin
 Zdzisław Szymborski as announcer
 Jarosław Boberek as Paproch
 Janusz Sieniawski as Sowa
 Krzysztof Dracz as Leon Trotsky
 Mateusz Banasiuk as a soldier

References

External links
 Official webpage
 

2011 films
2011 3D films
2011 war drama films
Polish historical drama films
Polish war drama films
2010s Polish-language films
Films set in 1920
Films set in Warsaw
Polish–Soviet War
2010s historical drama films
Polish epic films